Millennium Tower is a , 24 storey office building in Amsterdam constructed from 2002 and completed in 2004.

External links
 Millennium Tower at Skyscraper City

Office buildings completed in 2004
Skyscraper office buildings in the Netherlands
Buildings and structures celebrating the third millennium
Skyscrapers in Amsterdam